The Secretary of State for Employment and Social Economy is a senior minister of the Ministry of Labour and Social Economy responsible for carrying out the government policy on collective and individual labour relations, working conditions, unemployment benefits, promotion of employment, job training, social economy, and promotion of self-employment. It is also responsible for managing the European Union funds of the European Social Fund.

The Secretariat of State for Employment is structured through five departments, two directorates-general focused on all kind of labour issues, two deputy directorates-general for the managing of the European Social Fund and a deputy directorate-general for statistics and studies. As of January 2020, the Secretary of State managed a budget of €24.5 billion.

The current Secretary of State is Joaquín Pérez Rey, a University of Castilla–La Mancha professor and head of the University's Labour and Social Security Law Department.

History 
The Secretariat of State was created in 1981 with the name of Secretariat of State for Employment and Labour Relations. This Secretariat of State provisionally assumed all the departments and powers of the defunct Ministry of Labour and specifically the functions of the Undersecretariat of Labour, being integrated into the new Ministry of Labour, Health and Social Security. That same year, Health and Work were separated by creating the Ministry of Labour and Social Security and degrading the Secretariats of State to Undersecretariats, assuming the powers of this Secretariat of State, which was suppressed.

From 1985 to 2010, this department was maintained as an undersecretariat but with the denomination of "General Secretariat". It was in 2010, during the premiership of José Luis Rodríguez Zapatero, that the department was promoted again to Secretariat of State. The socialist government designed a structure for the secretariat that nowadays still exists, with the Directorate-General for Labour and the Directorate General for the Social Economy, Self-Employment and Corporate Social Responsibility. The powers over the administration of the European Social Fund have varied constantly.

In 2020 it was renamed as Secretariat of State for Employment and Social Economy.

Organization chart 
The Secretariat of State consists in four departments of different rank and a Cabinet:

 The Directorate-General for Labour.
 It is responsible for the labour relations and employment policies.
 The Directorate General for Self-Employment, the Social Economy and Corporate Social Responsibility.
 It is responsible for the government policies on social economy, self-employment and CSR.
 The Administrative Unit of the European Social Fund.
 It is the national authority responsible for the European Social Fund, the Youth Employment Initiative, the European Globalisation Adjustment Fund and the Fund for European Aid to the Most Deprived.
 The Deputy Directorate-General for Programming and Evaluation of the European Social Fund.
 It is responsible for the design of the programs to which the European funds of the European Social Fund will be applied, its control and evaluation.
 The Deputy Directorate-General for Statistics and Socio-Labour Analysis.
 It is responsible for the statistic studies of the Ministry and for making analysis and reports about labour matters.

The Secretariat of State has a Cabinet for the personal assistance and support to the Secretary of State.

Agencies and other bodies 
From Secretariat of State depends the following agencies and bodies:

 The Labour and Social Security Inspectorate.
 The State Public Employment Service.
 The Salary Guarantee Fund.
 The National Institute for Safety and Health at Work.
 The General Council of the National Employment System.
 The State Council for Corporate Social Responsibility.
 The General Council for Vocational Training.
 The National Commission for Safety and Health at Work.
 The Council for the Promotion of the Social Economy.
 The Self-Employment Council.

List of Secretaries of State

References

Secretaries of State of Spain